Doerflinger is a surname. Notable people with the surname include:

Preston Doerflinger (born 1973), American businessman and politician
Richard Doerflinger, American anti-abortion activist
Thomas Doerflinger (1952–2015), American historian
William Main Doerflinger (1910-2000), American folklorist and magician